Seo Jung-jin (born 6 September 1989) is a South Korean footballer who plays as a winger for Hwaseong FC.

Club career statistics

References

External links
 
 

1989 births
Living people
Association football wingers
South Korean footballers
South Korea under-20 international footballers
South Korea under-23 international footballers
South Korea international footballers
Jeonbuk Hyundai Motors players
Suwon Samsung Bluewings players
Ulsan Hyundai FC players
Seoul E-Land FC players
Asian Games medalists in football
Footballers at the 2010 Asian Games
K League 1 players
K League 2 players
Asian Games bronze medalists for South Korea
Sportspeople from Daegu
Medalists at the 2010 Asian Games